Grovo is a New York Citybased technology company that provides a SaaS learning platform to improve and advance employee and organizational performance.

History 
Grovo was founded in 2010 by co-founders Jeff Fernandez, Nick Narodny, and Surag Mungekar. Originally, it was a consumer-focused company delivering video training for digital skills. Grovo shifted to a B2B SaaS model in early 2013 and focused on developing its microlearning platform, aiming to provide everything employees need to learn to do their best work.

In May 2017, Axios reported that, the CEO along with the co-founders of the organization resigned from their posts, citing lack of financial discipline as the reason.

In November 2018, Grovo was acquired by Cornerstone OnDemand.

Business model 
Grovo provides companies with a software-as-a-service learning platform. Grovo refers to their approach as microlearning – 144-second video and audio lessons interspersed with short quizzes and practice assignments. In November 2017, Grovo announced a trademark on the term "Microlearning" from the U.S. Patents and Trademarks office. Grovo's microlearning library covers topics including digital skills, soft skills, management training, and HR/compliance training. Trainers and managers have access to a dashboard with learning management system tools and training analytics, as well as a client service team that aligns learning strategy to business goals.

Investors and funding 
In May 2011, Grovo announced that it had closed its seed funding from Krishna "Kittu" Kolluri; general partner at New Enterprise Associates, Andy Dunn; CEO and Founder of Bonobos, Mareza Larizadeh of Larizadeh Capital Partners and others.

On July 17, 2013, Grovo announced a $5.5 million Series A round of venture capital funding. Greg Waldorf, CEO-in-residence at Accel Partners ; founding investor and former CEO of e-Harmony, led the financing, which also included Jeff Clavier of SoftTech VC, Greg Sands of Costanoa Venture Capital, and Andy Dunn of Red Swan Ventures. Greg Waldorf joined the board of directors.

On February 18, 2015, Grovo announced a $15 million Series B round from existing investors Accel Partners, Costanoa Venture Capital, Greg Waldorf and SoftTech VC. The round closed on August 8, 2014. Accel's Sameer Gandhi joined Grovo's Board of Directors, along with Kirk Bowman.

On January, 2016, Grovo announced a $40 million Series C round led by Accel Partners with additional funding from previous backers Costanoa Venture Capital, SoftTech VC and Greg Waldorf, plus new investor Vayner Capital. To date, Grovo has raised a total of $65 million.

Reception 
2014

Internet Week named Grovo the "Best Place to Work in New York City Tech".

2015

CNNMoney named Grovo one of the "30 Most Disruptive Upstarts". Entrepreneur named the company one of the "Best Entrepreneurial Companies in America" and one of the "Best Company Cultures in 2015". The company was named "New York Startup of the Year" by Tech.Co, one of "NYC's Hottest Startups" by Symmetry50, and listed on the Crain's New York Business Top 100 Best Places to Work 2015. CEO Jeff Fernandez has spoken about the company's culture at events including SXSW, NewCo Festival New York, TEDx, Internet Week, and The Next Web Conference. Grovo's educational content and technology have been recognized with awards from Chief Learning Officer, Training Industry, and the ATD. Grovo was named one of the top learning management systems of 2015 by PC Magazine.

2016

No.2 on Fortune's 100 Best Medium Workplaces.

See also 
 Competency management system
 Educational technology
 Microcontent

References

Further reading

External links 
 

Educational technology
2010 establishments in New York City
American companies established in 2010